The 2019 Sandakan by-election was a by-election held on 11 May 2019 for the Dewan Rakyat seat of Sandakan. It was called following the death of incumbent, Wong Tien Fatt on 28 March 2019. Wong was a 2-term Member of Parliament for Sandakan since 2013. He was a member and Sabah state party chairman (2015-2019) of the Democratic Action Party (DAP), a component party of the Pakatan Harapan (PH) coalition.

Vivian Wong Shir Yee of DAP won the by-election by 16,012 votes out of the 21,595 votes cast with a bigger majority of 11,521 votes despite at a lower turnout rate at 54.44%.

Background 
Wong Tien Fatt had died of heart attack on 28 March 2019. Causing the Sandakan seat vacant and a by-election was called. The Election Commission (EC) had set the polling day for 11 May 2019. Early voting was held on 7 May 2019 and Nomination Day on 27 April 2019.

The electoral roll last updated on March 28 with a total of 40,131 voters was used. Of that figure, 39,856 are regular voters, 270 qualify as early voters and five voters who live abroad and qualify as absentee voters.

Sandakan's registered voters are 49% Chinese, 44% Muslim-Bumiputra, 6% non-Muslim Bumiputra, and 1% Indian and others.

Nominations
On 25 April 2019, Sabah Chief Minister Shafie Apdal announced that Sabah DAP's Vivian Wong Shir Yee, the daughter of the late incumbent, as the candidate for the alliance of Pakatan Harapan (PH), Sabah Heritage Party (WARISAN) and United Pasokmomogun Kadazandusun Murut Organisation (UPKO; later renamed United Progressive Kinabalu Organisation and now component party of PH) for the by-election. On 26 April, Shafie Apdal said that the alliance would use DAP's logo for the by-election as DAP won by a vast majority using their logo in the 14th General Elections (GE14).

United Sabah Party or Parti Bersatu Sabah (PBS); of the United Alliance or Gabungan Bersatu Sabah (GBS; later rebranded as Gabungan Rakyat Sabah or Sabah People's Coalition; GRS) had earlier mulls over their decision fielding a candidate. On 22 April 2019, the PBS finally announced their decision to contest the by-election. On 26 April, former Batu Sapi MP, Linda Tsen Thau Lin was announced as the PBS candidate. PBS would also use its own logo as GBS coalition is not registered while it had quit Barisan Nasional (BN) after GE14.

Homeland Solidarity Party or Parti Solidariti Tanah Airku (STAR); one of PBS's two allies beside United Sabah People's Party (PBRS) within GBS alliance had earlier announced its intention to field economist Jenny Liew Wean Chee, 50, who is its Tanjung Papat division chief to contest the Sandakan by-election. Somehow STAR had later retracted earlier decision to contest in the by-election in order to support their GBS counterpart and ally, PBS instead.

Sabah Progressive Party (SAPP) president Yong Teck Lee on 25 April had conveyed their backing for the party's former foe, PBS to its president Maximus Ongkili in the by-election; for the interest of Sabah rights.

Sabah Barisan Nasional (BN) and United Malays National Organisation (UMNO) chief Bung Mokhtar Radin said Sabah BN or UMNO would not contest the by-election but would support a single candidate from the Opposition front. There was speculation that Malaysian Chinese Association (MCA) might contest the by-election and Batu Sapi MCA Division Chief, Chew Kok Wah was touted as the candidate. On 21 April 2019, BN announced their intention to contest the by-election and candidate would likely come from the MCA or a direct member. On 22 April 2019, BN acting chairman, Mohamad Hasan made the final decision for BN to not contest the by-election.

Sabah Native Co-operation Party (Anak Negeri) intended to contest in the by-election since BN opted out of it and wished BN would support them instead. However the party did not contest.

Liberal Democratic Party (LDP), of which previous candidate Lim Ming Hoo contested the seat under BN ticket in the last GE14, announced that they would not contest this by-election. They also had earlier denied they had met their previous BN coalition partner, UMNO, and declared they would not work with them in the by-election.

Another former BN component; Parti Gerakan Rakyat Malaysia (Gerakan) cancelled their plan to contest by fielding the ex-Sabah deputy chief minister, Raymond Tan Shu Kiah, for the by-election after he resigned abruptly from the party. He joined WARISAN later.

The Sabah Pan-Malaysian Islamic Party (PAS) announced on 2 April that they were ready to field a candidate in the by-election and Sabah PAS commissioner Mohd Aminuddin Aling said the decision would be confirmed in a meeting later on. On 17 April 2019, PAS announced that they would not contest the seat and would support a candidate from the Opposition.

United Sabah National Organisation (USNO) also declared they would not contest and would support the PBS candidate in the by-election.

Businessman and former oil palm company manager Chia Siew Yung, 46, announced he would be contesting in the by-election as an independent. Other than Chia, at least two other independents, ex-Sabah National Trust Party (AMANAH) chairman / ex-Sabah PAS commissioner Hamzah Abdullah and youth activist Jufazli Shi Ahmad, also stated their wish to contest for the by-election. Sulaiman Abdul Samat, 36, the ex-Assistant Administrator of DAP Sandakan Parliament Service Centre, had also intended to join the by-election.

On 27 April Nomination Day, Vivian Wong of DAP and Linda Tsen of PBS along with 3 independents, Chia Siew Yung (key), Hamzah Abdullah (tree) and Sulaiman Abdul Samat (chair) filed their nomination papers to set for a five-cornered fight in the by-election.

Controversies and issues 
Finance Minister, Lim Guan Eng announced a RM2.28 billion development project to be held in Sandakan. This was widely criticised by social media for launching a project when the by-election was near.

DAP candidate Vivian Wong was criticised for cleaning a Muslim cemetery. Social media users cited that it was a political gimmick to gain Muslim Bumiputera votes.

PBS put up a controversial banner that claimed Finance Minister Lim Guan Eng had threatened Sandakan voters by saying he could not solve the issue of insufficient parking lots at the Sandakan Hospital in the event that DAP's candidate Vivian Wong lost in this by-election. DAP dismissed the claim and explained that Lim's remark was taken out of context. The banner was subsequently removed by the Election Commission.

Results

Note: 1Vivian Wong Shir Yee was a candidate of the Democratic Action Party (DAP), who had contested under the DAP banner instead of the PH banner.

Polling District Result
DAP won all the polling districts and post votes. PSB won the early votes with a razor thin majority.

Previous Result

References

2019 elections in Malaysia
By-elections in Malaysia
Elections in Sabah
Sandakan